Ferndorfbach (vulgarly known as the Ferndorf) is a river of North Rhine-Westphalia, Germany. It flows through Kreuztal and joins the Sieg in Siegen-Weidenau. Its name relates to the village of Ferndorf, the oldest medieval part of Kreuztal town.

See also
List of rivers of North Rhine-Westphalia

References

Rivers of North Rhine-Westphalia
Rivers of Siegerland
Rhine
Rivers of Germany